Mary Beatrice Davidson Kenner (May 17, 1912 - January 13, 2006) was an African American inventor who received five patents in her lifetime. She holds the record for the most patents awarded to a Black woman by the U.S government. Kenner’s first and most noted patent was in 1957 for the sanitary belt, the precursor invention to sanitary pads. She originally invented the belt 30 years prior in the 1920s but was not able to afford a patent and she faced racial discrimination when trying to market the product. Kenner’s following four patents included a sanitary belt with a moisture-resistant pocket, a toilet tissue holder, a hard-surface tray and pocket for holding items that mount to wheelchairs/walkers, and a wall-mountable back washer and massager.

Early life
Kenner was born on May 17, 1912, in Monroe, North Carolina, into a family of inventors. Her father Sidney Nathaniel Davidson patented a travel-sized clothing presser and her maternal grandfather Robert Phroneberger invented a tricolor light for signaling to trains and a stretcher on wheels for ambulances. Her sister Mildred Davidson Austin Smith (1916–1993) also grew up to patent a board game, Family Treedition, in the 1980s. This familial interest in inventing inspired Kenner from a very young age. At just 6 years old, she attempted inventing a self-oiling hinge for doors. She then went on to create other inventions throughout her childhood such as a portable ashtray that can be attached to cigarette packs and adding a sponge to the tip of an umbrella to soak up rain water[2].

Education
Kenner graduated from Dunbar High School in 1931 and gained admission into Howard University. She attended school for a year and a half but dropped out due to gender discrimination and financial difficulties. She then took on multiple odd jobs. In 1941 she became a federal employee for the remaining decade. In 1950, she became a professional florist and ran her flower shop into the 1970s while inventing things in her spare time.

Inventions, impact and legacy
In her lifetime, Kenner created many inventions and had many patents. Her first patent was in 1957 for the sanitary belt, which was before the time of adhesive pads, and her invention was much more effective than the rags women were using at the time. Menstruation was not commonly talked about during this time and was considered taboo.  In the 20s most women tended to make their own menstrual products at home out of cloths and rags and only really used commercial products, like Kotex pads, when they had to leave the house for school or work. She originally invented the sanitary belt in the 1920s, but she couldn’t afford a patent at the time. She improved her primary version overtime and was continually updating the invention. Three years later she filed another patent for a ‘sanitary belt with a moisture proof’ pocket, making it even more unlikely for blood to leak on to clothing.  The goal of the sanitary belt was to prevent the leakage of menstrual blood on clothing, which was a common problem for women at the time that was left unsolved. The Sonn-Nap-Pack Company heard of her invention in 1957 and was interested in producing her product, however when they learned that she was African-American, they were no longer interested.

Kenner described the situation in an interview saying, “One day I was contacted by a company that expressed an interest in marketing my idea. I was so jubilant … I saw houses, cars and everything about to come my way,”…“Sorry to say, when they found out I was black, their interest dropped”[2].

In 1976 Kenner patented an attachment for a walker or wheelchair that included a hard-surfaced tray and a soft pocket for carrying items. Kenner also invented a toilet paper holder that she patented. Her final patent, granted on September 29, 1987, was for a mounted back washer and massager.

Kenner never received any awards or formal recognition for her work. However, her inventions and contributions helped pave the way for subsequent innovations. Kenner still holds the record for the greatest number of patents awarded a Black woman by the U.S. government.

Her sanitary belt inventions led to the evolution of menstrual products into the sanitary pad which is currently still utilized today, continuously adapting to improve comfortability and leakage protection. Her other inventions have since evolved throughout the years with similar versions still remaining in use. She is regarded as the forgotten inventor who revolutionized menstrual products[1].

Personal life
While working as a federal employee, Kenner met her first husband, who was a soldier. After 5 years, the two divorced and around the same time Kenner left her job and opened a flower shop while inventing on the side in her free time. In 1952 Kenner remarried to James Kenner and in 1970 she sold her shop and the two moved to Virginia, where they became foster parents of 5 boys and eventually adopted a son[5].Kenner died at the age of 93 on January 13, 2006.

See also 
 List of African-American inventors and scientists
 Timeline of United States inventions

References
1.	BlackDoctor.org. (2020, April 21). Mary Beatrice Davidson Kenner: The forgotten inventor who changed women's Health Forever - Blackdoctor.org - Where Wellness & Culture Connect. BlackDoctor.org. Retrieved February 19, 2022, from https://blackdoctor.org/mary-beatrice-davidson-kenner-the-forgotten-inventor-who-changed-womens-health-forever/

2.	Massachusetts Institute of Technology. (n.d.). Mary Beatrice Davidson Kenner. Lemelson-MIT. Retrieved February 19, 2022, from https://lemelson.mit.edu/resources/mary-beatrice-davidson-kenner

3.	Raven , R. (2021, May 17). Happy birthday, Mary Kenner. Science Museum Group. Retrieved April 19, 2022, from https://www.sciencemuseumgroup.org.uk/blog/happy-birthday-mary-kenner/

4.	Rye, A. (2021, June 14). Mary Kenner (1912-2006). Black Past Organization. Retrieved February 19, 2022, from https://www.blackpast.org/african-american-history/mary-kenner-1912-2006/

5.	Schauf , L. (2020, June 16). Kick-Ass Women: Mary Beatrice Davidson Kenner. Women's National Book Association | NYC Chapter. Retrieved February 19, 2022, from https://wnba-nyc.org/kick-ass-women-mary-beatrice-davidson-kenner/

Further reading
 Blashfield, Jean F. (1996) Women inventors. Minneapolis: Capstone Press. Vol. 4,  pp. 11–16
 Jeffrey, Laura S. (September 1, 2013) Amazing American Inventors of the 20th Century. Enslow Publishers, pp 29–35
 Sluby, Patricia C. (2004) The Inventive Spirit of African Americans: Patented Ingenuity. Westport, Conn: Praeger,  pp 147–150 
 Women Inventors. Women Inventors | NCpedia, 2011, www.ncpedia.org/industry/women-inventors.

African-American inventors
Women inventors
1912 births
2006 deaths
20th-century American inventors
American women in business
20th-century African-American people
21st-century African-American people
20th-century African-American women
21st-century African-American women
People from Charlotte, North Carolina
People from Washington, D.C.